Fusiturricula jaquensis, common name the Surinam turrid, is a species of sea snail, a marine gastropod mollusk in the family Drilliidae.

Description
The size of an adult shell varies between 35 mm and 85 mm.

Distribution
This species occurs in the demersal zone from Colombia to Northern Brazil.

It has also been found as a fossil in Miocene strata of Venezuela; age range: 20.43 to 15.97 Ma.

References

  Tucker, J.K. 2004 Catalog of recent and fossil turrids (Mollusca: Gastropoda). Zootaxa 682:1–1295

External links
 

jaquensis
Gastropods described in 1850